The 2007 FIBA European Championship, commonly called FIBA EuroBasket 2007, was the 35th FIBA EuroBasket regional basketball championship held by FIBA Europe, which also served as Europe qualifier for the 2008 Summer Olympics, giving a berth to the champion and runner-up teams (or to the third-placed team in case Spain should reach the final). It was held in Spain between 3 September and 16 September 2007. Sixteen national teams entered the event under the auspices of FIBA Europe, the sport's regional governing body. The cities of Alicante, Granada, Madrid, Palma de Mallorca, and Seville hosted the tournament. Russia won its first EuroBasket title since the dissolution of the Soviet Union, by defeating hosts Spain, with a 60–59 score in the final. Russia's Andrei Kirilenko was voted the tournament's MVP.

Venues

Qualification

Of the sixteen teams that participated in EuroBasket 2005, hosts Spain plus the eight European teams that participated in the 2006 FIBA World Championship qualified directly. The other seven teams earned their berths via a qualifying tournament. The draw for the FIBA EuroBasket 2007 was held in Madrid on 19 October 2006.

Format
The top three teams from each group advance to the qualifying round, in which they are separated into two groups (A1, A2, A3, B1, B2, B3 on Group E; C1, C2, C3, D1, D2, D3 on Group F).
Results and standings among teams within the same group are carried over.
The top four teams at the qualifying round advance to the knockout quarterfinals (E1 vs. F4, E2 vs. F3, and so on).
The winners in the knockout semifinals advance to the Final, where both are guaranteed of berths in the 2008 Olympics. The losers figure in a third-place playoff. Before the tournament, the semifinal losers and the teams participating in the 5th-place playoff were assured of berths to the FIBA World Olympic Qualifying Tournament 2008.
Spain, which lost in the final to Russia, had already qualified for the Olympics as reigning world champions. Since they occupied what would otherwise be a qualifying place, third-place Lithuania received a direct Olympic berth, and seventh-place Slovenia advanced to the FIBA World Olympic Qualifying Tournament 2008.

Tie-breaking criteria
Ties are broken via the following criteria, with the first option used first, all the way down to the last option:
 Head to head results
 Goal average (not the goal difference) in the games between the tied teams
 Goal average in all games in its group

Squads

At the start of tournament, all 16 participating countries had 12 players on their roster.

Preliminary round

Times given below are in Central European Summer Time (UTC+2).

Group A

|}

Group B

|}

Group C

|}

Group D

|}

Second round

Group E

|}

Group F

|}

Knockout stage

Championship bracket

Quarterfinals

Semifinals

Third place

Final

Game Statistics

Head Coach:  Pepu Hernández

Head Coach:  David Blatt

Legend: PTS = points, FT = free-throws (made/attempts), 2-FG = 2-point field goals (made/attempts), 3-PG = 3-point field goals (made/attempts), Rebs = Rebounds

5th to 8th place

Statistical leaders

Individual Tournament Highs

Points

Rebounds

Assists

Steals

Blocks

Minutes

Individual Game Highs

Team Tournament Highs

Offensive PPG

Rebounds

Assists

Steals

Blocks

Team Game highs

Awards

Final standings

FIBA broadcasting rights
: BHRT
: BNT
: HRT
: RIK 2
: Česká televize
: Sport+ / Canal+
: DSF
: ERT
: Sport 5/Channel 10
: RAI
: TV3 Latvia
: TV3 Lithuania
: Basketball TV
: Polsat
: RTP
: RTR Sport
: Sport.ro
: RTS
: LaSexta
: RTV Slovenija
: NTV
: Megasport / Sport 1 Ukraine

References

External links
Eurobasket 2007 Official Site
2007 EuroBasket archive.FIBA.com
Information on tickets and venues

 
2007
2007–08 in Spanish basketball
2007–08 in European basketball
International basketball competitions hosted by Spain